Pizza Hut is an American multinational restaurant chain and international franchise founded in 1958 in Wichita, Kansas by Dan and Frank Carney. They serve their signature pan pizza and other dishes including pasta, breadsticks and dessert at dine-in, take-out and delivery chain locations. They also serve chicken wings on their WingStreet menu.

The chain, headquartered in Plano, Texas, operates 17,639 restaurants worldwide as of 2020, making it the world's largest pizza chain by number of locations. It is owned by Yum! Brands, Inc., one of the world's largest restaurant companies.

History
Pizza Hut began on May 31, 1958, by two brothers, Dan and Frank Carney, both Wichita State students, as a single location in Wichita, Kansas. The now famous little brick building was close to their childhood home and stomping grounds. The Carney brothers grew up in the College Hill neighborhood amongst many life long Wichita families where tree-lined streets were filled with historical homes with a scenic park as their playground. Six months after their launch, later they opened a second outlet and within a year they had six Pizza Hut restaurants.

One early employee was future Pro Football Hall of Fame head coach Bill Parcells, who had worked for the company while a college student and football player at Wichita State University. Parcells was considering a franchise for a career (as well as law school) but instead chose to enter coaching, eventually becoming a head coach in the National Football League.

The brothers began franchising in 1959. The iconic Pizza Hut building style was designed in 1963 by Chicago architect George Lindstrom and was implemented in 1969.PepsiCo acquired Pizza Hut in November 1977. Twenty years later, Pizza Hut (alongside Taco Bell and Kentucky Fried Chicken) were spun off by PepsiCo on May 30, 1997, and all three restaurant chains became part of a new company named Tricon Global Restaurants, Inc. The company assumed the name of Yum! Brands on May 22, 2002.

In August 1994, Pizza Hut and the Santa Cruz Operation (SCO) announced , a pilot program in the Santa Cruz area that allowed consumers to use their own computer to order pizza delivery from a local Pizza Hut restaurant, with connection being made over the Internet to a central Pizza Hut server in Wichita, Kansas.  The PizzaNet application software was developed by SCO's Professional Services group. PizzaNet was based on the first commercially licensed and bundled Internet operating system, SCO Global Access.

Before closing in 2015, the oldest continuously operating Pizza Hut was in Manhattan, Kansas, in a shopping and tavern district known as Aggieville near Kansas State University. The first Pizza Hut restaurant east of the Mississippi River was opened in Athens, Ohio, in 1966 by Lawrence Berberick and Gary Meyers.

The company announced a rebrand that began on November 19, 2014, in an effort to increase sales, which had dropped in the previous two years. The menu was expanded to introduce various items such as crust flavors and 11 new specialty pizzas. Work uniforms for employees were also refreshed. In 2017, Pizza Hut was listed by UK-based company Richtopia at number 24 in the list of 200 Most Influential Brands in the World.

On June 25 and 27, 2019, it was reported that Pizza Hut was bringing back their logo and the red roof design that was used from 1976 until 1999.

On August 7, 2019, Pizza Hut announced its intention to close about 500 of its 7,496 dine-in restaurants in the US, by the middle of 2021.

On August 18, 2020, it was announced that Pizza Hut will be closing 300 restaurants after the bankruptcy of NPC International, one of its franchise providers. A company representative stated, "We have continued to work with NPC and its lenders to optimize NPC's Pizza Hut restaurant footprint and strengthen the portfolio for the future, and today's joint agreement to close up to 300 NPC Pizza Hut restaurants is an important step toward a healthier business."

Concept
Pizza Hut is split into several different restaurant formats: the original family-style dine-in locations; storefront delivery and carry-out locations; and hybrid locations that have carry-out, delivery, and dine-in options. Some full-size Pizza Hut locations have a lunch buffet, with "all-you-can-eat" pizza, salad, desserts, and breadsticks, and a pasta bar. Pizza Hut has other business concepts independent of the store type.

In 1975, Pizza Hut began testing concepts with Applegate's Landing. These restaurants had exteriors that looked like Colonial Style houses and had eclectic interiors featuring a truck with a salad bar in the bed. The chain offered much of the same Italian-American fare, such as pizza and pasta dishes with some additions like hamburgers and bread pudding. Applegate's Landing went defunct in the mid-1980s except for one location in McPherson, Kansas that closed in fall, 1995.

An upscale concept was unveiled in 2004, called "Pizza Hut Italian Bistro". At 50 U.S. locations, the Bistro is similar to a traditional Pizza Hut, except that the menu features new, Italian-themed dishes such as penne pasta, chicken pomodoro, and toasted sandwiches. Instead of black, white, and red, Bistro locations feature a burgundy and tan motif. In some cases, Pizza Hut has replaced a red roof location with the new concept. Pizza Hut Express locations are fast food restaurants that offer a limited menu with many products not seen at a traditional Pizza Hut. These stores are often paired in a colocation with WingStreet in the US and Canada, or other sibling brands such as KFC or Taco Bell and found on college campuses, food courts, theme parks, bowling alleys, and within stores such as Target.

Vintage locations featuring the red roof, designed by architect Richard D. Burke, can be found in the United States and Canada; several exist in the UK, Australia, and Mexico. In his book Orange Roofs, Golden Arches, Phillip Langdon wrote that the Pizza Hut red roof architecture "is something of a strange object – considered outside the realm of significant architecture, yet swiftly reflecting shifts in popular taste and unquestionably making an impact on daily life. These buildings rarely show up in architectural journals, yet they have become some of the most numerous and conspicuous in the United States today."

Curbed.com reports, "Despite Pizza Hut's decision to discontinue the form when they made the shift toward delivery, there were still 6,304 traditional units standing as of 2004, each with the shingled roofs and trapezoidal windows signifying equal parts suburban comfort and strip-mall anomie." This building style was common in the late 1960s and early 1970s. The name "red roof" is somewhat anachronistic now since many locations have brown roofs. Dozens of these restaurants have closed or been relocated or rebuilt.

Many of the older locations with the red roof design have a beer if not a full bar, music from a jukebox, and sometimes an arcade. In the mid-1980s, the company moved into other formats, including delivery or carryout and the fast food "Express" model.

Products

In North America, Pizza Hut has notably sold:

 Pan pizza, baked in a pan with a crispy edge;
 "Stuffed crust" pizza, with the outermost edge wrapped around a cylinder of mozzarella cheese;
 "Hand-tossed", more like traditional pizzeria crusts;
 "Thin 'N Crispy", a thin, crisp dough which was Pizza Hut's original style;
 Dippin' Strips pizza, a pizza cut into small strips that can be dipped into a number of sauces;
 The P'Zone, a calzone with a marinara dipping sauce that comes in plain, Supremo, Meaty, and pepperoni
 The Bigfoot pizza, its largest product
 The Priazzo, a pie like pizza stuffed with pizza ingredients

The "stuffed-crust" pizza was introduced on March 26, 1995. By the end of the year, it had become one of their most popular lines.

Regional differences are seen in the products and bases. The company has localized to Southeast Asia with a baked rice dish called Curry Zazzle.

On May 9, 2008, Pizza Hut created "The Natural" pizza, which featured natural ingredients and was sold in Seattle, Denver and Dallas. This was discontinued on October 27, 2009, in the Dallas market.

Pizza Hut developed a pizza for use as space food, which was delivered to the International Space Station in 2001. It was vacuum-sealed and about 6 in (15 cm) in diameter to fit in the station's oven. It was launched on a Soyuz and eaten by Yuri Usachov in orbit.

In recent years, the chain has seen a downturn in profits. In 2015, the franchise stated it would be pumping more capital into its London branches. Pizza Hut is installing cocktail bars in its London branches as part of a £60 million bid to win back "the Nando's generation".

In January 2019, Pizza Hut announced it had expanded beer delivery to 300 locations across the U.S., with plans to expand to 1,000 locations by the summer.

In March 2019, Pizza Hut announced the return of the P'Zone after a hiatus of several years.

In March 2020, Pizza Hut Hong Kong announced that it had partnered with furniture retailer IKEA on a joint venture. IKEA launched a new side table called SÄVA, which was designed to resemble a pizza saver. The table would be boxed in packaging resembling a pizza box, and the building instructions included a suggestion to order a Swedish meatball pizza from Pizza Hut, which would contain the same meatballs served in IKEA restaurants. A 2021 menu addition, designed to commemorate the 25th anniversary of the introduction of stuffed-crust-pizza, was "nothing but the stuffed crust," a ring of dough filled with cheese.

Advertising

United States
Pizza Hut's first television commercial was produced in 1965 by Bob Walterscheidt for the Harry Crow agency in Wichita, and was entitled "Putt-Putt to the Pizza Hut". The ad looks just like an old movie and is set in fast motion. It features a man in a business suit and tie, played by Ron Williams, who was then a production manager for Wichita's ABC affiliate KAKE-TV, as he orders take-out, leaves his house, and gets into his 1965 Mustang JR to drive to Pizza Hut, where he is chased by a variety of townspeople, portrayed by neighborhood kids, Walterscheidt and his daughter, and various employees for Harry Crow and KAKE-TV. He goes inside Pizza Hut to pick up his pizza and drives home. People eat all the pizza before the man who ordered it can get any, which makes the man very upset, so he calls Pizza Hut again. The ad first aired on November 19, 1966, during halftime of the Notre Dame vs. Michigan State "Game of the Century", and dramatically increased sales for the franchise. "Putt-Putt to the Pizza Hut" ran on TV for eight years and was nominated for a Clio Award.

Until early 2007, Pizza Hut's main advertising slogan was "Gather 'round the good stuff". From 2008 to 2009, the advertising slogan was "Now You're Eating!". From 2009 to 2012, the advertising slogan was "Your Favorites. Your Pizza Hut" From 2012 to 2016, the advertising slogan was "Make it great", a variation of the 1987–1995 slogan "Makin' it great!". From 1995 to 1999, the slogan was "You'll love the stuff we're made of". The advertising slogan is currently "No one outpizzas the hut".

Pizza Hut does not have an official international mascot, but at one time, a series of commercials in the U.S. aired, titled "The Pizza Head Show". These commercials ran from 1991 to 1999 and was created by Walter Williams, creator of the Mr. Bill sketches from Saturday Night Live in the late 1970s - upon which the ad campaign was based. The ads featured a slice of pizza with a face made out of toppings called "Pizza Head". In the 1970s, Pizza Hut used the signature red roof with a jolly man named "Pizza Hut Pete". Pete was on the bags, cups, balloons, and hand puppets for the kids. In Australia during the mid to late 1990s, the advertising mascot was a delivery boy named Dougie, with boyish good looks, who upon delivering pizza to his father, would hear the catchphrase "Here's a tip: Be good to your mother". Adding to the impact of these advertisements, the role of Dougie was played by famous Australian soap opera and police drama actor Diarmid Heidenreich.

Pizza Hut sponsored the film Back to the Future Part II (1989) and offered a free pair of futuristic sunglasses, known as "Solar Shades", with the purchase of Pizza Hut pizza. Pizza Hut also engaged in product placement within the film, having a futuristic version of their logo with their trademarked red hut printed on the side of a mylar dehydrated pizza wrapper in the McFly family dinner scene, and appear on a storefront in Hill Valley in the year 2015.

The 1990 NES game Teenage Mutant Ninja Turtles II: The Arcade Game came with a coupon for a free pizza. The game included Pizza Hut product placement in the form of background advertisements and pizza that would refill the character's life.

In 1995, Donald Trump and his ex-wife Ivana Trump appeared in a commercial. The last scene of the commercial showed Ivana asking for the last slice, to which Donald replied, "Actually, dear, you're only entitled to half", a play on the couple's recent divorce.

In 1995, Ringo Starr appeared in a Pizza Hut commercial that teased to a Beatles reunion, but featured three members of The Monkees. A commercial with Rush Limbaugh dates from the same year, in which he boasts "nobody is more right than me," yet he states for the first time he will do something wrong, which was to participate in Pizza Hut's then "eating pizza crust first" campaign regarding their stuffed-crust pizzas.

In 1999, the announcer says, "The best pizzas under one roof" in the Big New Yorker pizza commercial seen on the PlayStation Pizza Hut Demo Disc 1. Also, in 1999, the game Crazy Taxi for Sega Dreamcast featured Pizza Hut as one of the locations to which players were able to drive and drop off customers. However, in the game's 2010 re-release for Xbox Live and PlayStation Network, all of the product placement, including the Pizza Hut locations, were removed and replaced with generic locations. 

Early 2007 had Pizza Hut move into several more interactive ways of marketing to the consumer. Using mobile-phone SMS technology and their MyHut ordering site, they aired several television commercials (commencing just before the Super Bowl) containing hidden words that viewers could type into their phones to receive coupons. Other innovative efforts included their "MySpace Ted" campaign, which took advantage of the popularity of social networking, and the burgeoning user-submission marketing movement via their Vice President of Pizza contest.

United Kingdom

In 1996, as part of Pizza Hut's global advertising strategy using celebrities, Formula One driver Damon Hill and BBC motorsport commentator Murray Walker advertised the stuffed-crust pizza, which parodies Walker's extravagant style.

Talk show host Jonathan Ross co-starred in an ad with American model Caprice Bourret. They advertised the new stuffed-crust pizza, with Jonathan Ross saying "stuffed cwust" due to his rhotacism.

Following England's defeat to Germany on penalties in the semifinals of Euro '96, Gareth Southgate, Stuart Pearce, and Chris Waddle featured in an advertisement, which shows Southgate wearing a paper bag over his head in shame as his penalty miss allowed England to lose the shootout. Waddle and Pearce, who both missed in a shootout vs West Germany at World Cup '90, are ridiculing him, emphasizing the word "miss" at every opportunity. After Southgate finishes his pizza, he takes off his paper bag, heads for the door, and bangs his head against the wall. Pearce responds with, "this time he's hit the post".

Russia

In 1997, former Soviet Union leader Gorbachev starred in a Pizza Hut commercial with his granddaughter Anastasia Virganskaya to raise money for the Perestroyka Archives. The ad "obviously exploited the shock value of having a former world leader appear... [and] played on the fact that Gorbachev was far more popular outside Russia than inside it". It was filmed on a multi-million budget with a cinematic quality, including mounting cameras on the Kremlin and shutting down Red Square to get the establishing shots of the square, and dialogue entirely in Russian with English subtitles, to show Pizza Hut as a global brand compared to its American rivals.

In recent years, Pizza Hut has had various celebrity spokespeople, including Jessica Simpson, the Muppets, and Damon Hill and Murray Walker.

Pizza Hut paid for their logo to appear on a Russian Proton rocket in 2000, which launched the Russian Zvezda module.

Pasta Hut

On April 1, 2008, Pizza Hut in America sent emails to customers advertising their pasta items. The email (and similar advertising on the company's website) stated: "Pasta so good, we changed our name to Pasta Hut!" The name change was a publicity stunt held on April Fools' Day, extending through the month of April, with the company's Dallas headquarters changing its exterior logo to Pasta Hut.

This name change was also used to promote the new Tuscani Pasta line and the new Pizza Hut dine-in menu. The first Pasta Hut advertisement shows the original Pizza Hut restaurant being imploded and recreated with a "Pasta Hut" sign. 

A version of this stunt was re-created by Pizza Hut's UK operation later that year in October 2008, which included ten locations in London temporarily taking on new "Pasta Hut" signage. Pizza Hut UK's chief executive at the time has insisted that this was solely intended as a "PR exercise" and the chain never planned on permanently changing its name in the UK or elsewhere.

Sponsorships

 In the early 1990s, as part of PepsiCo's sponsorship of The NewsHour with Jim Lehrer (and its former moniker, The MacNeil/Lehrer NewsHour), Pizza Hut was included in the acknowledgment alongside Taco Bell and KFC, which PepsiCo owned at the time.
 In 2000, Pizza Hut was a part-time sponsor of Galaxy Motorsports' #75 Ford in the then NASCAR Cup Series, driven by Wally Dallenbach Jr.
 Pizza Hut was the shirt sponsor of English football club Fulham F.C. for the 2001–02 season
 Terry Labonte drove selected events with Pizza Hut as the primary sponsor of his #44 car in 2005.
 Pizza Hut purchased the naming rights to Major League Soccer club FC Dallas' stadium, Pizza Hut Park, prior to its opening in 2005, which were allowed to expire in January 2012.
 In October 2015, Pizza Hut signed sponsorship deals with the Dallas Mavericks, Dallas Stars, and American Airlines Center.
 In February 2018, Pizza Hut signed a sponsorship deal to be the official pizza sponsor for the National Football League.
 Pizza Hut sponsored the #14 Brad Jones Racing Holden ZB Commodore driven by Todd Hazelwood for both of the Darwin Triple Crown and Townsville 500 in 2021.
 In March 2022, Pizza Hut signed a sponsorship deal to be the official Quick Service Restaurant for the Supercars Championship.

Book It!
Pizza Hut has sponsored the Book It! reading-incentive program since it started in January 1985. Students who read books according to the goal set by the classroom teacher, in any month from October through March, are rewarded with a Pizza Hut certificate good for a free, one-topping Personal Pan Pizza; and the classroom whose students read the most books is rewarded with a pizza party. Book It! was conceived in 1984 during a dinner with Art Gunther, President of Pizza Hut, and Bud Gates, SVP of Marketing at Pizza Hut, as a way to help Gunther's son read more.

The program has been criticized by some psychologists on the grounds it may lead to overjustification and reduce children's intrinsic interest in reading. Book It! was also criticized by the Campaign for a Commercial-Free Childhood in 2007 who described it as "one of corporate America's most insidious school-based brand promotions." A pamphlet produced by the group argued the program promoted junk food to a captive market, made teachers into promoters for Pizza Hut, and undermined parents by making visits to the chain an integral part of bringing up their children to be literate. However, a study of the program found participation in the program neither increased nor decreased reading motivation. The program's 25th anniversary was in 2010. The Book It! program in Australia ceased in 2002.

WingStreet

WingStreet is the name used for Pizza Hut's chicken wing menu.

In 2003, Yum! launched WingStreet in combination with existing Pizza Hut franchises. On October 19, 2009, Company president Scott Bergren publicized WingStreet's national launch. The chain predicted aggressive growth, adding more than 4,000 locations by 2010. In 2012, Pizza Hut opened a standalone pilot store in Denton, Texas. The store was unsuccessful in collecting sales and closed the following year.

Restaurants with WingStreet sections on their menus sell breaded and traditional buffalo wings for take-out and delivery. Their sauces include original Buffalo (in mild, medium, and hot levels of spiciness), sweet chili, spicy garlic, honey barbecue, and garlic Parmesan, as well as cajun and lemon pepper dry rubs. They also offer sauce-free "naked" wings.

International

Pizza Hut's international presence under Yum! Brands includes:

Canada and Mexico in North America
Japan, India, Bangladesh, Pakistan, Sri Lanka, China, Saudi Arabia, United Arab Emirates, United Kingdom, European Union, Qatar, Philippines, Vietnam, Thailand, Malaysia, Singapore, Indonesia, Brunei, Hong Kong, Taiwan, South Korea, Myanmar, and Macau in Asia 

Egypt

Pizza Hut's China operations are part of the Yum! spinoff Yum China. Pizza Hut was one of the first American franchises to open in Iraq.

China
In China, Pizza Hut used an altered business model, offering a fine-dining atmosphere with knives and forks and using an expanded menu catering to Chinese tastes. By 2008, Pizza Hut operated restaurants and delivery locations. That year, the company introduced "Pizza Hut Express", opening locations in Shanghai, Shenzhen, and Hangzhou. The 160 restaurants were in 40 Chinese cities in 2005. As of 2015, Pizza Hut had 1,903 restaurants in China.

Savio S. Chan (陳少宏, Pinyin: Chén Shàohóng) and Michael Zakkour, authors of China's Super Consumers: What 1 Billion Customers Want and How to Sell it to Them, stated middle-class Chinese perceive Pizza Hut as "akin to fine dining", though Pizza Hut was "China's largest and most successful foreign casual-dining chain".

Pakistan
Pizza Hut Pakistan is the Pakistani franchisee of Pizza Hut. It is owned by MCR (Pvt) Ltd and is headquartered in Karachi, Pakistan. The first outlet was opened in Karachi in 1993. Currently, Pizza Hut has a presence in 23 major cities.

Russia 

Pizza Hut began operating in Russia in 1991, when food supplies dwindled during the 1991 Soviet coup d'état attempt, prompting Russian President Boris Yeltsin to call Pizza Hut deliveries. Pizza Hut suspended operations in response to the 2022 Russian invasion of Ukraine.

Mongolia 
"Tavan Bogd Foods Pizza" LLC officially opened Pizza Hut on July 14, 2014 in Mongolia. They currently work under three concepts: Restaurant, Delivery, and Express, and provide products and services in 13 areas.

Panama 
In 2022, the Pizza Hut chain ceased its operations in Panamanian lands after re-reporting economic losses.

Ethiopia
In 2018, Pizza Hut officially opened in Ethiopia.

Criticism

In the United Kingdom, Pizza Hut was criticized in October 2007 for the high salt content of its meals, some of which were found to contain more than twice the daily recommended amount of salt for an adult. The toppings that consumers prefer, however, (ham, sausage, bacon, etc.) naturally contain high levels of salt.

To meet the Food Standards Agency 2010 target for salt levels in foods, between 2008 and 2010, the company removed over 15% of salt across its menu.

In July 2014, delivery drivers in the United States filed a class-action lawsuit over Pizza Hut "paying delivery drivers net wages below minimum wage due to unreimbursed automobile expenses" in violation of the 1938 Fair Labor Standards Act. An attempt by Pizza Hut to have the case dismissed in November 2015 failed. In December 2016, the case, Linkovich v. Capital Pizza Huts, Inc., et al., was decided by arbitration, in which Pizza Hut paid damages.

See also

 List of pizza chains
 List of pizza chains of the United States
 List of pizza franchises
 List of pizza varieties by country

References

Further reading

External links

 
 The Original Pizza Hut Museum at wichita.edu

1958 establishments in Kansas
1977 mergers and acquisitions
American companies established in 1958
Buffet restaurants
Companies based in Plano, Texas
Multinational food companies
Pizza chains of the United Kingdom
Pizza chains of the United States
 
Pizza franchises
Restaurants established in 1958
Yum! Brands
Fast-food chains of the United States
Fast-food franchises